Live is a live album by New Grass Revival, recorded on June 3, 1983, during the first bluegrass festival in France, Toulouse Bluegrass Festival, and released in 1984. It was the first New Grass Revival album to include Béla Fleck and Pat Flynn.

Track listing
 "White Freight Liner Blues" (Townes Van Zandt)
 "Good Woman´s Love" (Cy Coben)
 "One More Love Song" (Leon Russell)
 "Walking in Jerusalem" (Bill Monroe)
 "Watermelon Man"
 "Reach" (John Hall, Johanna Hall)
 "Sapporo" (Bush)

Personnel
 Sam Bush - vocals, mandolin, guitar, fiddle
 Pat Flynn - vocals, guitar
 Béla Fleck - banjo
 John Cowan - vocals, bass guitar

See also
New Grass Revival discography

New Grass Revival albums
1981 live albums